The Whee-lo or Magnet Space Wheel,  is a toy that propels a plastic wheel along both sides of a metal track with magnets built into the wheel. As the track is tilted up and down, the wheel rolls the length of the track, top and bottom, and then again on the opposite side of the wire. In this way, the wheel always keeps in contact with the track, and can be continually propelled on its cyclical course. With proper timing, the wheel can be brought to a great speed.

There have been many copies, but the first was Whee-Lo, The Magnetic Walking Wheel, introduced in 1953 by Maggie Magnetic Inc. of New York City. It included six colorful cardboard cutout discs ("Whee-lets") that attached to the wheel and created optical illusions as it spun.

A plastic piece at one end of the track serves as both a handhold for the toy and an adjustable slider to position the width of the track. The narrower the track, the faster the wheel goes, because the axle is thicker in the middle and you get more distance per each rotation of the wheel. Widen the track, and the wheel goes slower.

References

Magnetic devices
Mechanical toys